Govind Singh Rajput is an Indian politician from The Bharatiya Janata Party who is the cabinet minister in Government of Madhya Pradesh. Rajput was a Member of Madhya Pradesh Legislative Assembly from Surkhi in Sagar district from December 2018 to March 2020.

Political career
In December 2018, he was inducted into the Kamal Nath cabinet as Minister of Revenue & Transport in Madhya Pradesh. During 2020 Madhya Pradesh political crisis, he supported former Congress leader Jyotiraditya Scindia and was one of the 22 MLAs who resigned and Joined Bharatiya Janata Party. And on 21 April 2020, he became a cabinet minister.

See also
 2020 Madhya Pradesh political crisis

References

Living people
Madhya Pradesh MLAs 2008–2013
1964 births
Indian National Congress politicians from Madhya Pradesh
Madhya Pradesh MLAs 2018–2023
Bharatiya Janata Party politicians from Madhya Pradesh